The Lakeview Mountains are a range of low mountains encompassing approximately  of land in western Riverside County, Southern California, at the northern end of the Peninsular Ranges System.

Geography
The Lakeview Mountains are bordered: 
on the south by State Highway 74 and the communities of Homeland and Green Acres
on the east by the cities of Hemet and San Jacinto
on the west by the Perris Valley and the community of Nuevo
on the north by the community of Lakeview and the San Jacinto River.   The communities of Juniper Flats and MacLean Ranch are located within the Lakeview Mountains.

Petroglyph
Reinhardt Canyon, on the easterly side of the range, is the home of the prehistoric petroglyph known as the Hemet Maze Stone (California Historical Landmark No. 557).

Flora
The vegetation of the Lakeview Mountains consists primarily of the Coastal Sage Scrub and Montane chaparral and woodlands plant communities.

Geology
The Lakeview Mountains are the primary visible trace of the Lakeview Mountains Pluton, consisting primarily of Cretaceous tonalite.

See also
California chaparral and woodlands

References

External links 
Geologic Map of Lakeview Mountains (pdf)

Mountain ranges of Riverside County, California
Peninsular Ranges
Cretaceous California
Mountain ranges of Southern California